Irene Hayes (1896 – September 16, 1975) was a Ziegfeld girl and businesswoman who owned Irene Hayes Wadley & Smythe, a leading Manhattan florist, and Gallagher's Steak House after the death of her husband, Jack Solomon.

She bought the florist Wadley & Smythe on Park Avenue, adding her name, as no new businesses were allowed on Park Avenue at that time. "The right flowers do a lot of good and the wrong ones work mischief," she would often say. "I honestly believe that flowers, or rather the lack of them, have the power to change the map of the world. Do you think Nero would have burned Rome if he had been surrounded with the peace and gentleness of mimosa, lilies and acacia? I could mention any number of tyrants whose lives would have been less violent if only they had loved flowers."

An active participant in the Manhattan social scene, she was a good friend of the Nordstrom Sisters. Until her death in the 1970s she always had a table at the Ziegfeld Ball and made her home in Manhattan at her apartment on Sutton Place.

She died of an apparent heart ailment at St. Vincent's Hospital in Greenwich Village, New York City, aged 79 and was cremated at Ferncliff.

References

New York Times obituary, "Irene Hayes, 79, Florist Here, Dies", September 17, 1975.

External links

Gallagher's Steak House
Irene Hayes Wadley Smythe Florists

1896 births
1975 deaths
People from Manhattan
American women restaurateurs
American restaurateurs
Ziegfeld girls
American socialites
American stage actresses
20th-century American actresses
20th-century American businesspeople
20th-century American businesswomen